Susanna Moorehead is a British diplomat and civil servant who served as Chair of the OECD Development Assistance Committee from 2018 to 2022.

Early life and career
Moorehead holds a PhD in International Relations from London School of Economics and an Honorary Doctorate from University of York.

Career
In 2012 Moorehead was appointed to the advisory committee to the Central Emergency Response Fund (CERF). Members of the advisory group represent themselves and not their country. Other group members included Ahmed Al-Meraikhi of Qatar, Jozef H.L.M. Andriessen from the Netherlands, Ugandan Julius Oketta, Susan Eckey of Norway, Yukie Osa from Japan and Croatian Nancy Butijer.

Moorehead has served as the U.K. Ambassador to Ethiopia and Djibouti and Permanent Representative to the African Union and UNECA. She was the U.K. Executive Director to the World Bank Group, and the Department for International Development's Director for West and Southern Africa.

Other activities
 Global Partnership for Effective Development Co-operation, Member of the Steering Committee

References

Living people
Alumni of the London School of Economics
Year of birth missing (living people)
British women ambassadors
Ambassadors of the United Kingdom to Ethiopia